The 76th Flying Training Wing was a wing of the United States Army Air Forces.  It was assigned to the Army Air Forces Flying Training Command, and was stationed from 1943–46 at Smyrna Army Airfield, Tennessee.

There is no lineage link between the United States Air Force 76th Maintenance Wing, established on 5 February 1942 as the 76th Observation Group at MacDill Field, Florida and the 76th FTW of the Second World War.

History
The wing was a heavy bomber training wing of Eastern Flying Training Command.  Its schools provided four-engine heavy bomber transition training for experienced pilots who were moving from single and two-engine aircraft to the B-17 or B-24 Liberator heavy bombers.   Also after 1944, most pilots were learning on B-17/B-24s for eventual transition to B-29 Superfortress training under Second Air Force.

As training requirements changed during the war, schools were activated and inactivated or transferred to meet those requirements.

Lineage
 Established as 76th Flying Training Wing, on 14 August 1943
 Activated on 25 August 1943
 Disbanded on 16 June 1946.

Assignments
 Army Air Forces Eastern Flying Training Command, 25 August 1943
 AAF Western Flying Training Command, 15 December 1945 – 16 June 1946.

Training aircraft
The schools of the wing flew primarily B-17D/E/F Flying Fortresses.  Some B-17Gs were flown after June 1944 when Second Air Force B-17 training ended.    Some B-24D Liberators were also used

Assigned pilot schools

 Hendricks Army Airfield, Sebring, Florida
 AAF Pilot School (Specialized, 4-Engine)
 43d Pilot Transition Training (4-Engine)
 Opened: February 1942, Closed: December 1945 (B-17)
 Transition training for experienced single or two-engine pilots; primarily used for training B-29 Superfortress pilots after mid-1944

 Lockbourne Army Airbase, Columbus, Ohio
 AAF Pilot School (Specialized, 4-Engine)
 44th Pilot Transition Training (4-Engine)
 Opened: January 1943, Closed: February 1945 (B-17)
 Transition training for experienced single or two-engine pilots; WASP 4-engine school; primarily used for training B-29 Superfortress pilots after mid-1944; Later USAF Lockborune/Rickenbacker AFB, Now OH Air National Guard

 Smyrna Army Airfield, Smyrna, Tennessee
 AAF Pilot School (Specialized, 4-Engine)
 46th Pilot Transition Training (4-Engine)
 Opened: January 1942, Closed: October 1945 (B-17, B-24)
 Transition training for experienced single or two-engine pilots; primarily used for training B-29 Superfortress pilots after mid-1944; later USAF Smyrna/Stewart Air Force Base, closed 1971

See also

 Other Eastern Flying Training Command Flight Training Wings:
 27th Flying Training Wing (World War II) Basic Flight Training
 28th Flying Training Wing (World War II) Advanced Flight Training, Single Engine
 29th Flying Training Wing (World War II) Primary Flight Training
 30th Flying Training Wing (World War II) Advanced Flight Training, Two Engine
 74th Flying Training Wing (World War II) Classification/Preflight/Specialized/Navigation
 75th Flying Training Wing (World War II) Gunnery

References

Training wings of the United States Army Air Forces
1943 establishments in Tennessee
1946 disestablishments in Tennessee